Raymond Ovila Beaudoin (July 15, 1918 – April 6, 1945) was a United States Army officer and a recipient of the United States military's highest decoration, the Medal of Honor, for his actions in World War II.

Biography

Beaudoin was born in Holyoke, Massachusetts, and was serving as a first lieutenant in the U.S. Army near Hamelin, Germany, on April 6, 1945. He was leading his platoon over the open ground when all were pinned down by a devastating curtain of fire from enemy machineguns and automatic weapons. By rotating his men in firing position he enabled his platoon to dig in against the numerically superior force and inflict heavy casualties on it. However, enemy reinforcements made the platoon's position precarious. Despite a barrage of rifle and bazooka fire he reached the nest and wiped out three of its inhabitants, the fourth falling from covering fire from the American platoon. Continuing the attack, Lieutenant Beaudoin charged a dugout but was killed by a blast of machinegun fire. The runner was able to secure help, however; and the platoon was saved. For the supreme sacrifice which he made in saving the lives of the men under him, Lieutenant Beaudoin was posthumously awarded the Medal of Honor.

Medal of Honor citation

Rank and organization: First Lieutenant, U.S. Army, Company F, 119th Infantry, 30th Infantry Division. Place and date: Hamelin, Germany, 6 April 1945. Entered service at: Holyoke, Mass. Birth: Holyoke, Mass. G.O. No.: 9, 25 January 1946.

Citation:

See also

List of Medal of Honor recipients
List of Medal of Honor recipients for World War II

References

External links

1918 births
1945 deaths
United States Army personnel killed in World War II
United States Army Medal of Honor recipients
United States Army officers
People from Holyoke, Massachusetts
World War II recipients of the Medal of Honor
Deaths by firearm in Germany
Military personnel from Massachusetts